Elena Stan (born 7 April 1958) is a Romanian luger. She competed in the women's singles event at the 1980 Winter Olympics.

References

1958 births
Living people
Romanian female lugers
Olympic lugers of Romania
Lugers at the 1980 Winter Olympics
People from Sinaia